Lloyd Michael Williams is an American experimental filmmaker. He was born in 1940 in Brooklyn, NY and grew up on Long Island.

He was one of the co-founders of The Film-Makers' Cooperative along with Jonas Mekas. William's works Line of Apogee (1967), Rainbow's Children (1975), Wipes (1963), the Creation (1965) and Opus#5 (1961) were shown at the Museum of Modern Art. The sound tracks for Line of Apogee and Two Images for a Computer Piece were created by Vladimir Ussachevsky (the "father of electronic music") at the Columbia-Princeton Electronic Music Lab. Two Images was shown at the Whitney Museum of Arts as a part of the Composers Showcase. The electronic music was by Ussachevsky and the interlude was a live drum solo.

References

External links
Official homepage
Biography of Experimental Filmmaker Lloyd Michael Williams
 

1940 births
Living people
American film directors
American experimental filmmakers